Paul Sommer may refer to:

Paul Sommer (flying ace), List of World War II aces from Denmark
Paul Sommer (filmmaker) of Color Rhapsodies etc.
Paul Sommer, candidate in Kelston (New Zealand electorate)

See also
Paul van Somer
Paul Summers (disambiguation)